Haast's eagle (Hieraaetus moorei) is an extinct species of eagle that once lived in the South Island of New Zealand, commonly accepted to be the pouakai of Māori legend. Its massive size is explained as an evolutionary response to the size of its prey, the flightless moa, the largest of which could weigh . Haast's eagle became extinct around 1400, following the arrival of the Māori.

Taxonomy
Haast's eagle was first described by Julius von Haast in 1871 from remains discovered by the Canterbury Museum taxidermist, Frederick Richardson Fuller, in a former marsh. Haast named the eagle Harpagornis moorei after George Henry Moore, the owner of the Glenmark Estate, where the bones of the bird had been found. The genus name was from the Greek harpax, meaning "grappling hook", and ornis, meaning "bird".

DNA analysis later showed that this bird is related most closely to the much smaller little eagle as well as the booted eagle and not, as previously thought, to the large wedge-tailed eagle. Harpagornis moorei was therefore reclassified as Hieraaetus moorei.

H. moorei is estimated to have diverged from these smaller eagles as recently as 1.8 million to 700,000 years ago. If this estimate is correct, its increase in weight by ten to fifteen times is an exceptionally rapid weight increase. The suggested increase in the average weight of Haast's eagle over that period would therefore represent the largest, fastest evolutionary increase in average weight of any known vertebrate species. This was made possible in part by the presence of large prey and the absence of competition from other large predators. A recent mitochondrial DNA study found it to be more closely related to the little eagle than the booted eagle, with an estimated divergence from the little eagle around 2.2 million years ago.

Description

Haast's eagle was one of the largest known true raptors. In length and weight, it was even larger than the largest living vultures. Another giant eagle from the fossil record, Amplibuteo woodwardi, is more recently and scantly described but rivalled the Haast's in at least the aspect of total length. Female eagles were significantly larger than males.

The largest extant eagles, none of which are verified to exceed  in a wild state, are about forty percent smaller in body size than Haast's eagles.

It had a relatively short wingspan for its size. This wingspan is broadly similar to the larger range of female size in some extant eagles: the wedge-tailed eagle (Aquila audax), golden eagle (A. chrysaetos), martial eagle (Polemaetus bellicosus), white-tailed eagle (Haliaeetus albicilla) and Steller's sea eagle (Haliaeetus pelagicus) are all known to exceed 2.5 m in wingspan. Several of the largest extant Old World vultures, if not in mean mass or other linear measurements, probably exceed Haast's eagle in average wingspan as well.

Short wings may have aided Haast's eagles when hunting in the dense scrubland and forests of New Zealand. Haast's eagle has sometimes been portrayed incorrectly as having evolved toward flightlessness, but this is not so as evidence that it flew is very strong. Instead, it represents a departure from the mode of its ancestors' soaring flight to adapt to a dense woodland environment and the species probably had very broad wings.

Some wing and leg remains of Haast's eagles permit direct comparison with living eagles. The harpy eagle (Harpia harpyja), the Philippine eagle (Pithecophaga jefferyi), and the Steller's sea eagle (Haliaeetus pelagicus) are the largest and most powerful living eagles, and the first two also have a similarly reduced relative wing-length as an adaptation to forest-dwelling.

The Philippine eagle might be a particularly appropriate living species to compare with the Haast's eagle, because it too evolved in an insular environment from smaller ancestors (apparently basal snake eagles) to island gigantism in the absence of large carnivorous mammals and other competing predators. The eagle's talons are similar to modern eagles, suggesting that it used its talons for hunting and not scavenging.

The strong legs and massive flight muscles of these eagles would have enabled the birds to take off with a jumping start from the ground, despite their great weight. This characteristic would compensate for the reduction in wing area by providing additional lift.

Cave art depicts the Haast's eagle with a pale head. Combined with its vulture-like feeding behaviour, this might suggest it had a bald head, or had shorter feathers on its head than elsewhere on its body. However, this is uncertain; the bald heads of vultures appear to have evolved at least partly for thermoregulatory purposes, and scavenging birds in colder climates such as the Southern giant petrel often have fully feathered heads. As an inhabitant of a cool temperate forest, Haast's eagle would have had less need for thermoregulation than a large tropical vulture.

Behaviour

The Haast's eagle preyed on large, flightless bird species, including the moa, which was up to fifteen times the weight of the eagle. Its large beak also could be used to rip into the internal organs of its prey and death then would have been caused by blood loss. Due to the absence of other large predators or kleptoparasites, a Haast's eagle could easily have monopolised a single large kill over a number of days.

A 2021 analysis showed that, while predatory, the bill of the Haast's eagle was functionally closer to that of the Andean condor than to that of other eagles. This suggests that it deployed feeding tactics more similar to those of vultures after making a kill, plunging its head into the body cavity to devour the vital organs of its prey. This may have been an adaptation as a result of the bird hunting animals much larger than itself.

Extinction

Until recent human colonisation that introduced rodents and cats, the only placental land mammals found on the islands of New Zealand were three species of bat. Birds occupied or dominated all major niches in the New Zealand animal ecology. Moa were grazers, functionally similar to deer or cattle in other habitats, and Haast's eagles were the hunters who filled the same niche as top-niche mammalian predators, such as bears, lions, wolves, or jaguars.

One study estimated the total population of Haast's eagle at 3,000 to 4,500 breeding pairs. Early human settlers in New Zealand (the ancestors of the Māori arrived around the year 1280) preyed heavily on large flightless birds, including all moa species, eventually hunting them to extinction by around 1400. Both eagles and Māori probably competed for the same foods. Unlike humans, eagles were probably highly dependent on medium and large-sized flightless birds. The loss of its primary prey caused the Haast's eagle to become extinct at about the same time.

Relationship with humans
 
Some believe that these birds are described in many legends of the Māori, under the names Pouakai, Hokioi, or Hakawai. According to an account given to Sir George Grey, an early governor of New Zealand, Hokioi were huge black-and-white birds with a red crest and yellow-green tinged wingtips. In some Māori legends, Pouakai kill humans, which scientists believe could have been possible if the name relates to the eagle, given the massive size and strength of the bird. Even smaller golden eagles are capable of killing prey as big as sika deer or a bear cub. However, it has also been argued that the "Hakawai" and "Hokioi" legends refer to the Coenocorypha snipe—in particular the extinct South Island species.

Artwork depicting Haast's eagle now may be viewed at OceanaGold's Heritage and Art Park at Macraes, Otago, New Zealand.

See also
Island gigantism
Late Quaternary prehistoric birds
Poukai

References

External links

 
 Wingspan Birds of Prey Trust
 
 
 
Haast's Eagle on BBC

Apex predators
Birds described in 1872
Buteoninae
Eagles
Extinct birds of New Zealand
Hieraaetus
Late Quaternary prehistoric birds
Holocene extinctions
Pleistocene first appearances
Species made extinct by human activities
Taxa named by Julius von Haast